Winnicott is a surname. Notable people with the surname include:

 Clare Winnicott (1906–1984), English social worker, civil servant, psychoanalyst, and teacher
 Donald Winnicott (1896–1971), English pediatrician and psychoanalyst
 Russell Winnicott (1898–1917), English aviator